Tim Maccan is an Australian rugby league footballer who was selected for Italy in the 2013 Rugby League World Cup.

Playing career
Maccan played for the Tweed Heads Seagulls as a halfback.

In 2013, Maccan was named in the Italy squad for the World Cup.

References

1982 births
Australian rugby league players
Australian people of Italian descent
Italy national rugby league team players
Tweed Heads Seagulls players
Rugby league halfbacks
Living people
Rugby league players from Sydney